Marco Tagbajumi (born 1 July 1988) is a Nigerian-Italian former professional footballer.

Personal life
Tagbajumi was born in Nigeria, but also holds an Italian passport. His family moved to Norway when he was 5, and he played youth football for Skeid.

Club career
After moving to London, England with his family in 2008, Tagbajumi started playing non-league football for Kingsbury London Tigers. In 2009, he signed for AD Camacha in Portugal, and spent two seasons at the club before moving to Cyprus.

Strømsgodset
On 18 August 2015, Tagbajumi signed a loan deal with Strømsgodset for the remainder of the 2015 season. Strømsgodset secured an option to buy the player.

He played his first match for Strømsgodset when he came on as a substitute in the 82nd minute in the 4–2 win against local rivals Mjøndalen IF. A week later, he scored his first two goals for the club in his home debut, a 5–0 win against FK Haugesund on 11 September 2015.

After the 2015 season, Strømsgodset decided not to use the option to buy the player.

On 11 November 2016, Tagbajumi signed a one-year contract with Strømsgodset.

Honours

Club
 Lillestrøm
Norwegian Football Cup (1): 2017

References

External links

1988 births
Living people
Nigerian footballers
Association football forwards
Nigeria international footballers
Cypriot First Division players
Cypriot Second Division players
Saudi First Division League players
Eliteserien players
London Tigers F.C. players
APEP FC players
Ermis Aradippou FC players
AEL Limassol players
Strømsgodset Toppfotball players
FK Bodø/Glimt players
Dundalk F.C. players
Najran SC players
Nigerian expatriate footballers
Nigerian expatriate sportspeople in Cyprus
Nigerian expatriate sportspeople in Saudi Arabia
Expatriate footballers in Cyprus
Expatriate footballers in Norway
Sportspeople from Port Harcourt
Expatriate footballers in Thailand
Nigerian expatriate sportspeople in Norway
Expatriate footballers in Saudi Arabia
Akritas Chlorakas players
Expatriate association footballers in the Republic of Ireland
Nigerian expatriate sportspeople in Ireland